Jérémy Masson (born 6 October 1987) is a French short track speed skater. He competed in the men's 5000 metre relay event at the 2010 Winter Olympics.

References

External links
 

1987 births
Living people
French male short track speed skaters
Olympic short track speed skaters of France
Short track speed skaters at the 2010 Winter Olympics
Sportspeople from Savoie
21st-century French people